Janina may refer to:

 Alternative name for Ioannina, a Greek city
 Janina (album)
 Janina (given name), a female name (predominantly Polish)
 Janina (telenovela), Mexican telenovela
 Janina, Łódź Voivodeship (central Poland)
 Janina, Świętokrzyskie Voivodeship (south-central Poland) 
 Janina coat of arms
 Janina Irizarry, Puerto Rican singer
 383 Janina, a main belt asteroid